Calumma radamanus is a species of chameleon found in Madagascar.

References

Calumma
Reptiles of Madagascar
Reptiles described in 1933
Taxa named by Robert Mertens